Kissology Volume Two: 1978–1991 is a DVD/Home Video that was released by Kiss on August 14, 2007. It contains three discs, plus one of three separate bonus discs sold only within initial first pressings. Some initial packages included a replica ticket to Magic Mountain for Kiss Meets the Phantom of the Park. The box set was certified six times Platinum. This set was preceded by Kissology Vol. 1, and is followed by Kissology Vol. 3, which was released in early December 2007.

The bonus discs contain:
The Largo, MD show from the Dynasty Tour (sold only at Wal-Mart, Sam's Club and Amazon)
The New York Ritz Club show from the Crazy Nights World Tour (sold only at Best Buy)
The Tokyo show from the Crazy Nights World Tour (sold at all other retailers)

Track listings

Disc 1

Disc 2

Disc 3

Bonus Disc 1
(Only at Other Retail)

Bonus disc 2

(Only at Walmart, Sam's Club and Amazon)

Bonus disc 3
(Only at Best Buy)

Certifications

References

2007 live albums
2007 video albums
Kiss (band) video albums
Live video albums